Salko Bukvarević (20 April 1967 – 29 July 2020) was a Bosnian politician and soldier who served as the Federal Minister for Veterans and Disabled Veterans. 

In 1990, Bukvarević was one of the founders of the Party of Democratic Action. During the Bosnian War he served in the Bosnian army and was one of the founders of the Patriotic League paramilitary unit. Following the war he served in multiple positions before being appointed as the Minister for Veterans and Disabled Veterans, which he served as from 31 March 2015 until his death due to COVID-19 complications on 29 July 2020.

Early life and education
Bukvarević was born on 20 April 1967, in Gornje Hrasno, Kalesija, SR Bosnia and Herzegovina, SFR Yugoslavia. In 1986, he graduated from high school in Tuzla. In 1996, he graduated from the Mining-Geological-Civil Engineering Faculty with an undergraduate degree, with a Master's degree in 2004, and a Doctorate in 2011. He later married and had two children.

Career

Army
From 1992 to 1995, Bukvarević served in the Army of the Republic of Bosnia and Herzegovina. He was one of the founders of the Patriotic League paramilitary unit and received the unit's gold medal.

Politics
Bukvarević was one of the founders of the Party of Democratic Action in 1990. From 1996 to 1999, he served as a member of the Party of Democratic Action's presidency.

From 1995 to 1998, he served as the Secretary of the Tuzla Canton Committee inside the Party of Democratic Action. From 1998 to 2007, he served as the Director of the Public Facility Bosnian Cultural Center in the Tuzla Canton. From 2007 to 2010, he served as a representative in the Tuzla Canton Assembly.

Ministry
On 31 March 2015, Bukvarević was appointed to serve as the Federal Minister for Veterans and Disabled Veterans.

In 2016, representatives of the Association of Demobilized Soldiers of the Army of the Republic of Bosnia and Herzegovina and the Croatian Defence Council protested, calling for Bukvarević's resignation and created a resolution calling for the resolving of the existential issues of the families of martyrs, war invalids, demobilized veterans and winners of the highest recognition and decorations. Bukvarević refused to resign stating that the organization was representative of less than ten percent of veterans.

Death
On 22 July 2020, Bukvarević contracted COVID-19 during the COVID-19 pandemic in Bosnia and Herzegovina, was placed on a ventilator on 28 July, and died on 29 July at the Clinical Center of the University of Sarajevo. On 1 August, he was buried in Džindić mosque in Tuzla, Bosnia and Herzegovina.

References

External links
 Salko Bukvarević at fmbi.gov.ba

1967 births
2020 deaths
Bosniak politicians
Bosniaks of Bosnia and Herzegovina
Army of the Republic of Bosnia and Herzegovina soldiers
Bosnia and Herzegovina politicians
Party of Democratic Action politicians
Politicians of the Federation of Bosnia and Herzegovina
Deaths from the COVID-19 pandemic in Bosnia and Herzegovina